Aberdeen competed in the Scottish Premier League, Scottish Cup, Scottish League Cup and UEFA Cup in the 2007–08 season. It was the club's first season in European competition since 2002–03.

Qualification for the group stages of the UEFA Cup was secured with an away-goals qualifying victory over Dnipro. Aberdeen were drawn in Group B along with Panathinaikos, Lokomotiv Moscow, Atlético Madrid and Copenhagen. Aberdeen qualified for the round of 32 following a 4–0 victory over F.C. Copenhagen. They were drawn against Bayern Munich and lost 7–3 on aggregate, but did manage a 2–2 home draw with the German club.

Transfers

Summer transfers
Aberdeen had already announced that the contracts of Jamie Winter and David Donald were not to be renewed. Gary Dempsey rejected a new two-year deal to sign for Yeovil Town, and Dyron Daal left to join St Johnstone.

Aberdeen had secured the signatures of defenders Lee Mair from Dundee United, and youngster Jonathan Kurrant, who would join after he had finished his A-Levels. Both agreed pre-contracts. Wolverhampton Wanderers' experienced defender Jackie McNamara and De Graafschap winger Jeffrey de Visscher both signed on free transfers. Former player Derek Young returned to the club on a free transfer after spells at Dunfermline and Partick Thistle. Sone Aluko was signed on loan from Birmingham City.

On 8 June, it was reported that Aberdeen's first-choice goalkeeper Jamie Langfield had been demoted after falling out with manager Jimmy Calderwood. The fall-out was believed to have been related to Calderwood's decision to reject a £70,000 offer from Rangers. The club later confirmed that they had made Langfield available for transfer, with an asking price of £100,000. Langfield was recalled to the starting line-up for the UEFA Cup game against Dnipro at Pittodrie on 20 September. The day after Aberdeen's UEFA Cup victory over Copenhagen on 20 December, Langfield signed a new three-year contract with Aberdeen.

On 27 June, club captain Russell Anderson moved to Premier Leagu side Sunderland, signing a 3-year contract with the club. He donated his signing-on fee to the youth development scheme at Pittodrie.

Winter transfers

Chris Clark was the first player to leave Aberdeen in the January window, signing a three-and-a-half-year deal with Plymouth Argyle. The clubs agreed a fee of £200,000 for the midfielder who had played at Aberdeen for seven years. Michael Paton extended his loan deal with Brechin City until the end of the season. Striker Stuart Smith and defender Neil McVitie both went on loan to Peterhead until the end of the season.

Stuart Duff was Aberdeen's first signing of the January transfer window. They signed the midfielder from Dundee United on a free transfer. Sone Aluko agreed to extend his loan from Birmingham City until the end of the season. Defender Dave Bus was signed from De Graafschap until the end of the season. Aberdeen signed Middlesbrough midfielder and England under-18 captain Josh Walker on a loan deal until the end of the season. The Republic of Ireland international Alan Maybury was signed from Leicester City on a loan deal until the end of the season.

After Michael Hart rejected a new deal with Aberdeen, a fee thought to be in the region of £200,000 was agreed between Aberdeen and Preston North End for his transfer. However, Preston reduced their offer after carrying out medical tests on an injury due to keep him out for weeks. Aberdeen refused to release the player unless Preston paid the agreed fee. He eventually moved to Preston for an undisclosed fee thought to be in the region of £100,000.

Summer clearout
It was announced on 15 April that seven contracted players would be leaving at the end of the season. Barry Nicholson decided to leave, rejecting a new deal. The other six players – goalkeepers Derek Soutar (who had replaced Jamie Langfield for a large part of the season) and Greg Kelly, defenders Richie Byrne and Dave Bus and strikers Jonathan Smith and Steve Lovell – were not offered new deals. Loan signings Sone Aluko and Josh Walker returned to their clubs at the end of their loan periods.

On 21 April, Jackie McNamara was released from his contract by the club.

Results

Pre-season friendlies

Scottish Premier League

UEFA Cup

Scottish League Cup

Scottish Cup

Players

First-team squad
Squad at end of season

Left club during season

Statistics

Goalscorers

Source: BBC Sport
Ordered by: Total, SPL, Cups then Name 
Name: Players's Name, flag next to name indicates player's nationality. SPL: No. of goals scored in the Scottish Premier League. Cups: No. of goals scored in the Scottish League Cup, Scottish Cup and Uefa Cup. Total: Total No. of competitive goals scored.

Discipline

Source: BBC Sport
Name: Players's Name, flag next to name indicates player's nationality. : No. of sending offs by direct red card. : No. of sending offs by second yellow card. : No. of bookings.

Competitions

Overall

SPL

Classification

Results summary

Results by round

Club

The management

Other information

Team kit

|
|
|

See also
 List of Aberdeen F.C. seasons

Notes

References

External links
 Aberdeen FC website
 2007/08 Fixtures & Results
 BBC My Club page

Aberdeen F.C. seasons
Aberdeen